, also known as The Demon of Kickboxing, is a manga written by Ikki Kajiwara and illustrated by Kentaro Nakajou. It was based on the life of the kickboxer Tadashi Sawamura.

History 
Written by Ikki Kajiwara and illustrated by Kentaro Nakajou, the manga was published in 1969 in the magazine Shōnen King. It received an anime television series in 1970 that ran until 1971 by Toei Animation. Ikki Kajiwara is known for his other sports manga, one of them, Ashita no Joe, is illustrated by Tetsuya Chiba and was published between 1968 and 1973 in Weekly Shōnen Magazine. The staff at Toei found it easier to animate Oni after gaining experience with physical contact sports anime Tiger Mask (also written by Kajiwara).

Plot 
The series chronicled the true story of kickboxer Tadashi Sawamura.

In this series, Tadashi Sawamura, was an arrogant karate fighter who was defeated by a kickboxer, leaving Sawamura in a mild coma. Once in the hospital and recovering from the coma, his opponent's kickboxing trainer Noguchi, came to his hospital room and convinced Sawamura to become a kickboxer. To which after some rigorous training, he learned a devastating finishing move: "The Jumping Vacuum Knee" (Shinku tobi hiza geri).

Cast 
 Koji Asakura as Tadashi Sawamura
 Kiyoshi Kobayashi as Osamu Noguchi
 Michiko Nomura as Etsuko
 Minori Matsushima as Youko
 Yuuji Nishimoto as Hideki

References

External links 
 

1970 anime television series debuts
1971 Japanese television series endings
Anime series based on manga
TBS Television (Japan) original programming
Karate in anime and manga
Kickboxing television series